Lucky Me or LuckyMe may refer to:

In film
 Lucky Me (film), a 1954 comedy starring Doris Day, Robert Cummings and Phil Silvers
 Lucky Me, a 2013 autobiography by Sachi Parker about her life and mother Shirley MacLaine

In music 
LuckyMe (record label)
 Lucky Me (Killing the Dream album) 
 Lucky Me (Lucky Luciano album), a 2001 album by rapper Lucky Luciano
 Lucky Me (EP), a 2002 EP by Duke Special
Lucky Lucky Me, Leroi Brothers

Songs
 "Lucky Me" (Anne Murray song), a 1980 song by Anne Murray
 "Lucky Me" (Bachelor Girl song), a 1998 song by Bachelor Girl
 "Lucky Me", a song by The Moments (US group)
 "Lucky Me", a song by Sarah Slean
 "Lucky Me", a song by Chris Brown from the album Graffiti
"Lucky Lucky Me", Marvin Gaye

Other
 Lucky Me (noodles), a brand of instant noodles owned by Monde Nissin

See also
 "Lucky Me, Lucky You", a 1997 song by Lee Roy Parnell
 "Lucky, Lucky Me", a 1964 song by Marvin Gaye
 Lucky to Me, a 1939 British musical comedy film directed by Thomas Bentley and starring Stanley Lupino, Phyllis Brooks and Barbara Blair